Tepeköy railway station is a railway station in Torbalı and is the southern terminus of the İZBAN Southern Line. The station was originally opened on 14 November 1861 by the Oriental Railway Company. Between 2015–16, Tepeköy was rebuilt and expanded from a one track station to three tracks to service commuter trains to and from Alsancak Terminal in Izmir.

A low-level side platform serves one track with 16 daily regional trains running between Basmane Terminal in Izmir and destinations southeast and a high-level island platform serves two tracks for IZBAN commuter trains to Izmir and Aliağa.

Since 8 September 2017, Tepeköy serves as a transfer station between İZBAN trains from İzmir and from Selçuk. Trains from Alsancak terminate at the station along with trains from Selçuk.

Connections
Tepeköy is serviced by several bus services that operate to neighboring towns and villages. The stop is located on 4550th Street.

References

Railway stations in İzmir Province
Railway stations opened in 1861
1861 establishments in the Ottoman Empire
Torbalı District